Qafeel, is a neighborhood  in the sub-governorate of Bariq in  the province of Asir, Saudi Arabia. It is one of the largest neighborhoods of Bareq.

References

Bibliography 
 Umar Gharāmah al-ʻAmraw: al-Muʻjam al-jughrāfī lil-bilād al-ʻArabīyah al-Suʻūdīyah : bilād Bāriq, Jiddah 1399 A.H / 1978.
 Maḥmoud ibn Muḥammad Al Shubaylī: Al-Shariq : fi tarikh wa jughrāfīat bilād Bāriq., Riyadh "2001 / 1422 A.H" 

Populated places in 'Asir Province
Populated coastal places in Saudi Arabia
Populated places in Bareq